The Inkarri (or Inkari and sometimes Inkaríy) myth is one of the most famous legends of the Inca. When the Spanish conquistadores executed the last ruler of the Inca people, Atahualpa, he vowed (according to the legend) that he would come back one day to avenge his death. According to the legend, the Spaniards buried his body parts in several places around the kingdom:  His head is said to rest under the Presidential Palace in Lima, while his arms are said to be under the Waqaypata (Square of tears) in Cuzco and his legs in Ayacucho. Buried under the earth he will grow until the day that he will rise, take back his kingdom and restore harmony in the relationship between Pachamama (the earth) and her children.

Since it has been passed on orally for many generations, several different versions of the Inkarri myth exist. The name Inkarri probably evolved from the Spanish Inca-rey (Inca-king).

The mythical lost city of Paititi is said to have been founded by Inkarri.

In popular culture

The legend of Inkarri is the background story and the title of a novel by Ryan Miller.

A comprehensive analysis in French has been published on the web as "Incarri, la prophétie du retour de l'Inca".

The legend of Inkarri is addressed as a character in the James Rollins novel Excavation.

See also
 Inca mythology
 Taki Unquy

Quechua people

References

External links
 Tales of Inkarrí in Quechua

Inca mythology